The Day of Victory in the Great Fatherland Liberation War (Victory Day) is a national holiday in North Korea celebrated on July 27 to mark the signing of the Korean Armistice Agreement which brought a cease fire to the Fatherland Liberation War (Korean War) that took place in 1950–53; it is referred to as "Victory Day" despite the fact that the war is generally regarded as ending as a tie. On this day ceremonies are held at the Victorious Fatherland Liberation War Memorial.

History
In 1973, July 27 was designated as the Day of Victory in the Great Fatherland Liberation War. Ceremonies such as central plenary meetings (중앙보고대회, also alternatively translated as national meetings) were done in a small scale only in the 5th and 10th anniversaries.  

From 1993 to 1998, central plenary meetings were held annually. 

In 1996, during the 43rd anniversary, the day was promoted to the status of a national holiday, which involved raising the North Korean flag and resting for one day. In 1999, central plenary meetings were omitted. From 2000 to 2002, the ceremonies were reduced in size and was mainly run as a cultural athletic event due to the inter Korean summits. In 2003, the size of the ceremonies increased due to international tensions and nuclear crisis.

See also
Culture of North Korea

References

Public holidays in North Korea
Victory days
July observances
Annual events in North Korea
Summer events in North Korea